Andre Begemann and David Pel were the defending champions but only Begemann chose to defend his title, partnering Igor Zelenay.

Begemann successfully defended his title after defeating Marek Gengel and Tomáš Macháč 6–2, 6–4 in the final.

Seeds

Draw

References

External links
 Main draw

Wolffkran Open - Doubles
2021 Doubles